Julian Bleach (born 29 December 1963) is an English actor, singer and playwright, who is known as co-creator and "MC" of Shockheaded Peter, a musical entertainment based on the works of Heinrich Hoffmann, which won the 2002 Olivier Award for Best Entertainment. He is also known for playing Davros in the 2005 revival of Doctor Who (in 2008 and 2015).

Early life
Bleach was born in Bournemouth. He was educated at Summerbee School and studied drama at Bournemouth and Poole College. After that he trained at London Academy of Music and Dramatic Art.

Career
Bleach's other theatre work includes playing Ariel to Patrick Stewart's Prospero in the RSC's 2007 production of The Tempest, directed by Rupert Goold, and Mr. Sowerberry (to Louise Gold's Mrs. Sowerberry) and Dr. Grimwig in the 2009 Theatre Royal Drury Lane production of the musical Oliver!.

On television, he has starred as "The Monster" in the 2007 ITV adaptation of Frankenstein.
He played the Grand Master from the second series of children's drama M.I.High and guest-starred as the villainous "Ghostmaker" in Peter J. Hammond's "From Out of the Rain" in the second series of Doctor Who spin-off series Torchwood. Bleach was later recruited by the parent series as Davros, enemy of The Doctor and creator of the Daleks, in "The Stolen Earth" and "Journey's End", the two-part season finale of the 2008 series, and live at the Doctor Who Prom, before returning to the role in the 2015 series opener, "The Magician's Apprentice", and its conclusion, "The Witch's Familiar". In 2010, it was announced that he would star as the eponymous character in The Nightmare Man, the opening story of Series 4 of The Sarah Jane Adventures. This makes him one of only two actors (the other being Paul Marc Davis) to appear in not only Doctor Who, but two of its spin-offs, Torchwood and The Sarah-Jane Adventures. In 2011, he appeared as Niccolò Machiavelli in the Showtime series The Borgias.

In 2016 Bleach appeared as Barkilphedro in the critically acclaimed new musical The Grinning Man at Bristol Old Vic which transferred in late 2017 to Trafalgar Studios. In the same year he also appeared in Rory Mullarkey's new play Saint George and the Dragon at the Royal National Theatre.

Filmography

Film

Television

Video games

Theatre

References

External links 
 

1963 births
Living people
Alumni of the London Academy of Music and Dramatic Art
20th-century English male actors
21st-century English male actors
English male stage actors
English male television actors
English male musical theatre actors
English male Shakespearean actors
English dramatists and playwrights
English male dramatists and playwrights
Actors from Bournemouth
Royal Shakespeare Company members